Jehanabad Assembly constituency is an assembly constituency in Jehanabad district and South Bihar region of Bihar. It is the part of Jahanabad (Lok Sabha constituency).

Overview 
There are 2,86,098 voters in the constituency of which 1,50,106 are male, 1,35,984 female and 8 others. In 2015 Bihar Legislative Assembly election, Jehanabad assembly constituency is one of the 36 seats to have VVPAT enabled electronic voting machines.

Members of Legislative Assembly

Election Results

2020

References

External links
 

Assembly constituencies of Bihar